Rabban may refer to:

 Glossu Rabban, a character from Frank Herbert's Dune (1965)
 Joseph Rabban (8th century), Jewish merchant

People with the given name Rabban:

 Ali ibn Sahl Rabban al-Tabari (circa 838–870), Jewish scientist
 Rabban Bar Sauma (circa 1220–1294), Uyghur Christian
 Rabban Markos, Patriarch of the Church of the East
 Simeon Rabban Ata (13th century), high representative of Syriac Christianity

Jewish teachers given the title Rabban, a title traditionally given to the head of the Sanhedrin during Tannaitic times:

 Rabban Yochanan ben Zakai
 Rabban Gamaliel
 Rabban Shimon ben Gamaliel
 Rabban Gamaliel II of Yavneh
 Rabban Shimon ben Gamaliel II

Lectors in the Ancient Church of the East 
 Rabban Bar Sauma
 Rabban Markos

Masculine given names
Hebrew-language surnames